The Thorney Interchange is a large motorway intersection in the UK, between the M4 and M25. It is one of the busiest motorway interchanges in the UK. It is situated directly on the edge of Buckinghamshire, Greater London (London Borough of Hillingdon) and Berkshire. It is also not too far from Surrey and Staines-upon-Thames.

History
The M4 (London-South Wales Motorway) under the interchange was opened in December 1964, from junctions 4 (A408) to 5; this 3.9-mile section cost £3.2m, and was built by Cubitts and Green. The interchange, hence, is junction 4b of the M4.

The interchange is around one mile north-west of Heathrow Airport; the interchange is the main junction for traffic heading from the M25 to the airport. The interchange is the point that the M4 enters Greater London.

Design
The bridge decks were to be built of prestressed concrete, but instead were built with composite steel beams and concrete decks, designed to BS 5400. In the early 1980s, when the interchange was being built, the entire M25 was to cost around £600m.

The southern part of the M4/M25 interchange was part of a 2.05-mile section of the M25 which was due to open in spring 1985, the Poyle to Thorney Mill Road section, from junction 14 (Poyle Interchange) to junction 15. The £44m contract, given to the joint venture of Cementation/Costain, was to take three years. The M25 section was due to be open nine months before the M4/M25 interchange would open.

The northern section of the interchange was to be part of a 10.5-mile section of the M25 also due to open in spring 1985; this later became the 4-mile M4 to Iver Heath section to the M40, at Denham Interchange junction 16. The 6.5-mile section of the M25 directly north of the M40 opened in January 1985.

Much of the M25 was designed by Halcrow Group. The interchange was designed by Atkins.

Construction
3.5m cubic metres of infill was needed for the contoured landscaping. 

The section of M25 to the north began construction in April 1983. Construction took 28 months, and cost £25m, with £10m for the fifteen bridges, by Wimpey Construction. The bridges were built to allow expansion to four lanes at a later date. The M25 was opened by Nicholas Ridley, Baron Ridley of Liddesdale on Wednesday 18 September 1985, an 11-mile section directly south of the M40 to Poyle. The section had cost £80m. The M4/M25 junction was planned to open at a later date of June 1986, but it opened six months early, due to good weather, on Thursday 19 December 1985. At the time of opening two sections of the M25 remained – in Hertfordshire and Kent (which opened in February 1986), and the M4/M25 junction was expected to be the busiest motorway junction in the UK.

Structure
It is a typical stack interchange. The part of the interchange that is north of the M4 is in Iver, in South Bucks. It is named after Thorney, Buckinghamshire, now part of Iver, the village in which the northern part of the interchange in situated. The part of the interchange that is south of the M4 is in Colnbrook with Poyle, in Slough. West Drayton and Harmondsworth are close to the east.

There are 11 bridges and three major viaducts, varying from 182m to 264m long. A 229m viaduct carries the M25 over the M4. 

A single-track disused railway line passes through the middle of the interchange. The railway line, the former Staines and West Drayton Railway, is still there. The railway line went from West Drayton railway station, to the north, to Staines West railway station, to the south, and the disused section passes through the Lakeside Road Industrial Estate to the south.

References

External links
 M25 junctions at the IHT Motorway Archive
 SABRE

1985 establishments in England
Buildings and structures in Buckinghamshire
Buildings and structures in Slough
M25 motorway
M4 motorway
Motorway junctions in England
Roads in Berkshire
South Bucks District
Transport in Buckinghamshire
Transport in Slough
Transport infrastructure completed in 1985